FCV Farul Constanța, commonly known as Farul Constanța or simply as Farul, is a Romanian professional football club based in the city of Constanța, Constanța County, which currently plays in the Liga I. Farul is a Romanian word which translates as "the Lighthouse", alluding the fact that Constanța is the largest port on the Black Sea coast. 

Established in 1920 as SPM Constanța, the team has spent over 40 seasons in the first league, the highest position it achieved being fourth place on three occasions, last time at the end of the 1973–74 season. It also played one Cupa României final in 2005, which it lost 0–1 to Dinamo București. Farul has produced several talented players, the most notable of them being Gheorghe Hagi, the joint top goalscorer of the Romania national team; he currently holds shares in the company and is also in charge of the senior team.

"The White and Blues" play their home games on the Viitorul Stadium in Ovidiu, since their traditional Farul Stadium is in an advanced state of degradation, this will be demolished and a new one will be built in its place.

History

Early years (1920–1949)
The club was founded in 1920 as SPM Constanța (Serviciul Porturi Maritime – Maritime Port Services), and by this name it played until 1946, when it was renamed PCA Constanța (Porturi Comunicații Ape – Communication Ports Maritime).

Ascent (1949–1960)
The modern history of the football club from Constanța eventually started in 1949, when the two teams of the city, Dezrobirea Constanța and PCA Constanța, merged forming a new club that would be called as Locomotiva PCA. The new club was registered for the Divizia B promotion play-off, along with four other regional champions: Metalul 1 Mai Ploiești, Dinamo Oltenița, Progresul CPCS București and Bucegi Câmpulung Pitești. Constănțenii finished first in the group and were promoted to the second league.

In 1953 Locomotiva PCA Constanța was renamed simply as Locomotiva Constanța. One year later, at the end of the 1954 season, Locomotiva Constanța obtained its first promotion to the Divizia A. The team was ranked 1st in the third series of the Divizia B, with three points more than the 2nd place, Dinamo Bacău. After the last game, an away 1–0 win against Dinamo Bârlad, the players were welcomed at Constanța's old train station by a large crowd that had come to celebrate the promotion. The players that obtained the performance with Locomotiva were as follows: Nebela, Doicescu, Zlotea, Mark, Tatomir, Jarnea (Bedivan, Manta), Vultur, Neli Ispas, Gogu Cojocaru, Sever, Cristof, Bobi Georgescu, Gigi Datcu, Linzoiu, Keszkei; coached by Ion Troancă.

In the spring of 1955 Locomotiva began their first season in the first league. The team was strengthened with players from Politehnica Timișoara, CFR București and Flamura Roșie Arad, and had a new coach in the person of Eugen Mladin. The first match of "the Sailors" was played in Bucharest against the future champion, Dinamo București. Gogu Cojocaru opened the score and became the first scorer of the team in the first league, but the match was lost 4–1. At the end of the season, Locomotiva finished 12th out of 13 and was relegated to Divizia B. During the same season the Farul Stadium (named at that time as 1 Mai Stadium) was inaugurated. The debut match was a 4th round league game between Locomotiva and the defending champions, Flamura Roșie Arad. The game was played on 23 March 1955, and it was won 1–0 by the hosts after a goal scored with a shot from 40 meters by Manole.

Locomotiva finished the 1956 Divizia B season on the 6th place, then on the 3rd position at the end of 1957. The return to an autumn-spring format at the beginning of 1957–58 season and the renaming of the team to Farul Constanța had brought good luck to the "Sailors", who won the second league and returned to the first scene of Romanian football. After a tough first season in which the club finished just above the relegation positions, Farul made their best season until that point and finished 4th at the end of the 1959–60 edition. The squad used was composed of: Horia Ghibănescu, Nicolae Botescu, Grigore Ciuncan, Lucrețiu Florescu, Gheorghe Corneanu, Gheorghe Toma, Petre Comăniță, Mircea Bibere, Eugen Pană, Gheorghe Datcu, Vasile Stancu, Constantin Moroianu, Ion Ciosescu, Paul Niculescu, Dumitru Sever, Iacob Olaru, Ștefan Nunu – players; Iosif Lengheriu – head coach; Foti Foti – President.

European and International debut (1960–1967)

The 1960s began with "the Sharks" on the first football scene of the country. Due to the failure of newcomers Brânzei, Stancu and Vasilescu to integrate in the squad, at the end of the 1960–61 season Farul finished 13th and was relegated alongside CSMS Iași and Corvinul Hunedoara. Motivated by a new presence in the first league, Constanțenii did not stay long in the Divizia B and at the end of the 1961–62 season, promoted back to the first league, after finishing first. Also in that season, Farul achieved its first national football title, by winning the U-19 championship. In the following year "the Sailors" had a very good season and managed to end the first part of the season as the leaders of the Divizia A. The second part was not as good as the first and they lost some positions, ranking fifth at the end of the championship. Also in the 1962–63 season, the offensive trio Bükössy-Ciosescu-Dinulescu has been remarked by managing to score 48 goals. Farul Constanța won the second consecutive title in the U-19 league, the students of Gheorghe Smărăndescu defeating Dinamo București with the score of 2–1, in the final.

The next three seasons started well for Farul, but were finished on mediocre positions. In the 1963–64 season, the club from the shore of the Black Sea finished 8th after occupying the 3rd place at the end of the first half, the season in which appeared in the squad the all-time goalscorer of Farul, Marin Tufan (62 goals). In the following year "the Sailors" trembled and finished at only one point above the first relegated team, Minerul Baia Mare, then, in the 1965–66 edition, Farul occupied only the 9th place, out of 14. A notable performance gained by the team from Constanța was the qualification for the 1964–66 Balkans Cup, which was their first participation in European competitions. On 28 April 1965, was registered the first European match of "the Sailors", Farul meeting Spartak Plovdiv, in a game played away and ended undecided, score 1–1. The second match played in Constanța two weeks later was won 1–0 by Farul, this being the first European success in the history of the club. In the next game, "the white and blues" played in Skopje, against Vardar, which they defeated 4–0, in the second match being recorded a new victory, this time only with the score of 1–0. Then came the match against the Greek side, Olympiacos, the victories being divided, at Piraeus, won the Greeks with 1–0 and at Constanța, Farul, by forfait, thus obtaining the first place in Group A. The final of the competition was a Romanian one, Farul met Rapid București, but the team from Constanța lost on aggregate, after a 3–3 draw in Bucharest and a 0–2 loss in Constanța. Another notable performance of that season was the good run from the Romanian Cup, where "the Sharks" were eliminated in the semi-finals by UTA Arad (2–3).

In the 1966–67 season, Farul made again a good impression in the Divizia A and finished 4th. The squad that made that performance was formed of: Vasile Utu, Constantin Tâlvescu, Constantin Manciu, Marin Georgescu, Constantin Koszka, Martin Graef, Suliman Etem, Cicerone Manolache, Constantin Pleșa, Dumitru Antonescu, Ilie Ologu, Marin Tufan, Constantin Iancu, Tiberiu Kallo, Ion Zamfir, Dumitru Caraman, Iosif Bükössy, Constantin Mareș, Vasile Dumbravă; Virgil Mărdărescu – head coach; Foti Foti – President. At the end of that season, as a reward for the form shown, Farul went into the first international tournament, played in Lebanon, Kuwait and Syria, where "the Sailors" played 6 games.

Farul, between success and mediocrity (1967–1988)

Farul competed in the 1966–67 Balkans Cup and were drawn in group against AEK Athens (3rd place in the Alpha Ethniki), Lokomotiv Sofia (8th place in the Bulgarian First League) and Vardar (10th place in the Yugoslav First League). The Sailors" started with two consecutive wins in Constanța, 4–1 against Lokomotiv Sofia and 2–0 against Vardar Skopje. However, they could not replicate their good home form in the away matches, and they lost all three: 0–4 against Vardar, 0–3 against AEK Athens and 1–5 versus Lokomotiv Sofia. In the last match of the group they made a 1–1 draw against AEK and finished the group in the 3rd place.

The Sharks finished the 1967–68 season on the 7th position, and competed once again the Balkans Cup. Their opponents were Beroe Stara Zagora (10th place in the Bulgarian First League), Vllaznia Shkodër (6th place in the Albanian Superliga) and Gençlerbirliği (6th place in the Süper Lig). The results obtained were as follows: 3–1 and 2–1 against Gençlerbirliği, two defeats with the same score of 1–2 at Shkodër and Stara Zagora, followed by a 2–1 win against Vllaznia in Constanța and a 1–2 defeat against Beroe. Farul ended the group on the 3rd place and didn't qualify for the next stage.

In the next two seasons, Farul consolidated its reputation as a hard team to beat They finished 9th and reached the semi-finals of the 1968–69 Cupa României at the end of the 1968–69 season. This was followed by obtaining the 6th place in the league and reaching the quarter-finals of the Cupa României in the 1969–70 season.

Early 1970s transformed Farul in a regular team from the middle of the Divizia A standings: 1970–71 – 11th, 1971–72 – 11th and 1972–73 – 8th, but the club had a refresh in the summer of 1973 when was renamed as FC Constanța. The restart had a positive effect and the team finished 4th at the end of the next season, qualifying for the 1975 Balkans Cup. The format of the competition had changed, and the group was formed by only three teams, in Constanța's group being assigned Eskişehirspor (4th place in the Süper Lig) and Lokomotiv Sofia (5th place in the Bulgarian First League). One victory (2–1 against Lokomotiv Sofia), one draw (2–2 against Eskişehirspor) and two defeats (1–2 and 0–1 against Eskişehirspor and Lokomotiv), both in away matches.

Between 1974 and 1988 FC Constanța had fluctuating results, oscillating between the first and the second leagues, being far from the results obtained in the second half of the 1960s and the first half of the 1970s. After two rankings in the middle of the standings, 10th place, at the end of the 1974–75 and 1975–76 seasons, FC Constanța was at only one step from relegation, finishing the 1976–77 season just above the relegation zone, at the same number of points with the first relegated team, Rapid București. FC Constanța did not take this warning seriously, relegating at the end of the next season after finishing 16th, out of 18. Back in Divizia B after 16 years of absence, Constanța finished only 4th in the first season, then 2nd at the end of the 1979–80, but far away from the leader, Brașov. "The Sailors" promoted back to the first league in 1981, but made another pale season and finished only 14th, two points over the relegation line, being relegated finally at the end of the 1982–83 season. Followed four consecutive Divizia B seasons with mediocre results: 1983–84 – 5th, 1984–85 – 4th, 1985–86 – 4th and 1986–87 – 4th. The club promoted back in the Divizia A at the end of the 1987–88 season after winning its series, being also renamed as Farul Constanța in the summer of 1988. During this time, despite the weaker results, the team from the shore of the Black Sea gave some big names to the Romanian football, such as: Gheorghe Hagi, Constantin Gache, Ștefan Petcu or Ion Moldovan, among others.

From UEFA Intertoto to Divizia B (1988–2001)
The late 1980s and early 1990s found Farul in the Divizia A, but with results which did not impress too much: 1988–89 – 9th, 1989–90 – 10th, 1990–91 – 10th, 1991–92 – 13th, 1992–93 – 9th and 1993–94 – 6th. Things started to change during the 1994–95 season, which was an important one for the team from the shore of the Black Sea. Even if the ranking was lower than in the previous season, 11th, Farul was enrolled in the 1995 UEFA Intertoto Cup, making its debut in the competition. The five teams group in which the team from Constanța was assigned was formed of: Cannes (9th place in the Ligue 1), Dnepr Mogilev (5th place in the Belarusian Premier League), Bečej (4th place in the First League of Serbia and Montenegro) and Pogoń Szczecin (8th place in the Ekstraklasa). Farul won surprisingly the group, after 3 victories, 1 draw and no defeat. The draw brought in front of Farul an important club, Heerenveen, 9th place in the Eredivisie in the previous season. The match was played in the Netherlands on 29 July 1995 at the Abe Lenstra Stadion. The stadium was not full, with only 5,000 spectators present, out of a total capacity of 20,000 seats. The match was clearly dominated by the Dutch side, for which played also a young man named Jon Dahl Tomasson, who would become a well-known player over a few years. Florin Marin, the coach of Farul, sent on the field the following 11: Cristian Munteanu – Stelian Carabaș, Daniel Ghișan, Marian Dinu (C), Mihai Matei, Ștefan Nanu – Gheorghe Barbu, Dănuţ Moisescu, Gheorghe Ciurea – Mugurel Cornățeanu, Laurențiu Zadea. The course of the game was in a single direction, to the Farul's goal. In the 19-minute Erik Regtop opened the score and 16 minutes later same Regtop increased it. After the break, Jon Dahl Tomasson (48') and Romeo Wounden (71') set the final score, 4–0. "The Sailors" continued their good form also next season, especially in the Romanian Cup, where were eliminated in the quarter-finals.

After the UEFA Intertoto adventure, Farul returned to its middle-table results from before the 1995 and finished on the following positions: 1995–96 – 8th, 1996–97 – 10th, 1997–98 – 12th and 1998–99 – 12th. The most notable performance of these seasons was the 1000 match played by Farul in the top flight of the Romanian football, performance achieved during the 1998–99 campaign. The financial problems and lack of interest of the local authorities of the time put their mark on the team in the 1999–2000 season, when at the end of the 34 rounds, "the Sharks" relegated to Divizia B. Before the last round, "the Sailors" were on the 13th position, which was saving them, but in the 34th round they lost 1–2 against FC Onești and finished 15th, relegating after 12 years spent on the first stage of the Romanian football.

Motivated by the return to the first stage, Constănțenii dominated alongside Sportul Studențesc the 1st series of the Divizia B and finished the 2000–01 season on the second place with 74 points. The second place assured them a promotion/relegation play-off against FCM Bacău, 14th place in the Divizia A. The two clubs equally shared victories, (2–1 and 1–2), Farul promoted finally, after the penalty shoot-outs. The return in the top flight was also marked by the beginning of the owner's era at Constanța. During the Socialist Republic of Romania all the football clubs were owned by public institutions, after the Romanian Revolution the ownership continued in a dual aspect, clubs owned by public institutions and clubs owned by businessmen. 1990s and early 2000s are known as the start of the owner's era in the Romanian football when most clubs have become private, and generally run by a single businessman. The businessman from Constanța who bought Farul was Gheorghe Bosânceanu, owner of the Constanța Shipyard.

The rise and fall to bankruptcy (2001–2016)
Despite being in a better financial situation, "the Sailors" finished on the 14 place in the 2001–02 season and had to play in the promotion/relegation playoff. Farul met FC Baia Mare and defeated them 1–0 in Constanța. A 0–0 draw at Baia Mare meant that the white and blues remained in the Divizia A.

There were several seasons of growing for the club from the shore of the Black Sea. In the 2002–03 season they ended on the 10th place, then in the 2003–04 season on the 9th and in the 2004–05 season on the 5th place (the best ranking after the Revolution), being called in that year "the champion of the province", the first four places were occupied by: Steaua București, Dinamo București, Rapid București and Național București. In the same season, "the Sharks" obtained one of the greatest performances in their history, by playing the Cupa României final. The 67th final of the Cupa României was played on the Cotroceni Stadium, between Farul Constanța and Dinamo București, in front of 15,000 people (of which about 6,000 came from Constanța), the referee was from France, Laurent Duhamel. Petre Grigoraș started the match with the following team: George Curcă (C) – Răzvan Farmache, Ion Barbu, Cristian Șchiopu, Cosmin Pașcovici (75' – Mihai Baicu) – Florin Lungu, Adrian Senin, Dinu Todoran (85' – Laurențiu Florea) Mihai Guriță, Vasilică Cristocea (10' – Iulian Apostol) – Liviu Mihai. Dinamo won 1–0, goal scored by Ștefan Grigorie in the 6th minute.

After a very good run in the 2004–05 edition of the championship and the cup, Farul continued its good form also in the next season, when was reaching the semi-finals of the Romanian Cup, being eliminated by Național București, 2–4 on aggregate. In the Divizia A "the Sailors" finished 7th and the club enrolled in the 2006 UEFA Intertoto Cup, where they eliminated Pobeda, 4–2 on aggregate and Lokomotiv Plovdiv, 3–2 on aggregate. In the final stage of the competition, Farul met Auxerre (6th place in the Ligue 1). The French team took part in the competition due to the non-participation of the Italian side, Palermo (because of the 2006 Italian football scandal). The "double" with Auxerre offered the team at the seaside the chance to set a premiere in the history of the club, the first participation in the UEFA Cup. Farul lost 2–4 on aggregate and missed the chance of participating in the UEFA Cup. In that season, despite the investments of more than 2 million€ promised by the owner Gheorghe Bosânceanu, after the match against Auxerre, Farul remained the whole season in the bottom of the rankings, ending the 2006–07 season on the 14th place.

The 2007–08 season is considered to be one of the most spectacular post-Revolution seasons of the Liga I, but it found Farul in a not-so-good form. Constănțenii were even the last one of the league for three rounds. "The sailors" managed to save themselves from relegation and finished on the 13th place. The next season would represent the beginning of the decline for the club from the shore of the Black Sea. After almost 10 years spent in the top flight, Farul was relegated again in the second league, after failing to finish above the red line of the standings. The last match of Farul in the first division also represented a negative record of that season, "the Sharks" losing against Otopeni with the score of 0–6.

The relegation has brought also the withdrawal of Gheorghe Bosânceanu, the owner of the club in the last eight years, who sold it to Giani Nedelcu, former investor at Rocar București and Știința Bacău, clubs which went bankrupt in the period when Nedelcu ruled them. The supporters have not been too optimistic ever since and their fears would be fulfilled in the next years, when Farul has struggled in vain, without getting any promotion. In the 2009–10 season, Farul doesn't find the resources needed for a quick promotion on the first stage and finished on the 8th place. The beginning of the next season was full of emotions, the club receiving the Liga II license very late because of the financial problems which were now bigger. These problems put their mark on the play of the team as well, "the Sailors" ending the season only 13th. In the 2011–12 season, "the Sharks" made a progress and finished 8th, but far away from the promotion places.

The smell of the Liga III was beginning to feel with the 2012–13 season. From the first series have relegated five teams in that season. FCM Bacău, Astra II Giurgiu and Callatis Mangalia withdrew from the championship, while Dinamo II București and Chindia Târgoviște relegated. Due to these championship withdrawals, Farul finished first over the red line, just one point above Chindia. In the 2013–14 season, Liga II change its format to the play-off / play-out system, and "the Sailors" finished the regular season on the 11th place, in the play-out zone. In the play-out phase they ended up on the last place but again are saved from relegation to the third division due to the exclusion of Dunărea Galați. In the 2014–15 season, Farul played again in the play-out, where it finished on the 4th place and saved from relegation. Things seemed to change in the 2015–16 season when Farul finished the regular season on the 4th place and entered the play-off group. "The Sharks" have managed to obtain 29 points and finished on the 5th place, giving to the supporters the chance to hope for a better next season. However, the growing financial problems eventually suffocated the club and before the start of the 2016–17 season, Farul withdrew from the second league. The situation has remained uncertain for a while, Giani Nedelcu hoping, however, that he will even be able to get the license for the third league. The FRF Licensing Commission, however, announced they would not allow this because of an imminent bankruptcy that would hit the club from Constanța.

On 22 September 2016 Farul Constanța was declared bankrupt, after 67 years in which represented the city of Constanța in the Liga I, Liga II, Cupa României, UEFA Intertoto Cup and Balkans Cup.

Rebirth, merger with Viitorul and return of Hagi (2016–present)

When it became clear that bankruptcy was unavoidable, a group of Farul supporters, organized in the Farul Supporters Association, moved quickly and in just a few weeks managed to build and register a new entity with the sole purpose to continue the tradition of Farul Constanța. Thus, on 8 August 2016 they founded Suporter Spirit Club Farul Constanța, club which assured the football continuity of Farul, avoiding seasons of extinction or pause.

The new club retained the white and blue colors and adopted Farul's old logo which portrays the lighthouse of Constanța, the Black Sea and a seagull in flight. The team was enrolled in the Constanța County series of Liga IV in time for the 2016–17 season. Farul won their series of Liga IV. They recorded 32 victories in 34 games, and scored 135 goals while conceding 14. "The Sailors" then won the promotion play-off 8–2 on aggregate against Tulcea County champions Pescărușul Sarichioi and were promoted to the Liga III. In the summer of 2017 Petre Grigoraș was named as the new coach and important players have been transferred. Farul promoted at the end of the 2017–18 season, but after a tough fight against Progresul Spartac București, the team with which they had the same number of points until the last rounds of the season.

In the summer of 2018, former Romanian international footballer Ciprian Marica bought Farul Constanța's brand for €49.150 (around 228.892 RON). The move sparked a short-lived conflict between Marica and Farul's supporters, despite the former claiming to have tried to have a dialogue with SSC Farul's leadership, ultimately leading Marica to form a new team, FC Farul Constanța, and enroll it in Liga IV. Ultimately, Marica and the supporters reached a consensus, with the ex-footballer announcing that he's going to take over SSC Farul; in addition, the Liga IV team would become the club's reserve team and the brand will be transferred to the Liga II side by winter. In his first press conference as Farul's owner, Marica announced his future plans for the club, including promotion back in Liga I by 2020, followed by slowly building a team to aim for a place in the European competitions and league title.

On 21 June 2021, Gheorghe Hagi, owner and founder of Viitorul Constanța, Gheorghe Popescu, chairman of Viitorul, and Ciprian Marica, owner of Farul Constanța, announced in a press conference that their teams have merged. The club that would continue in the Liga I will be Farul, while Viitorul virtually disappeared in the process of merger. Farul will play its home matches on the Viitorul Stadium, as the old Farul Stadium will be in a rebuilding process.

Youth program

As the senior teams of Farul and Viitorul merged in 2021, the Farul Constanța Academy subsequently merged with Gheorghe Hagi Football Academy. Young players aged between 8 and 13 are now part of Gheorghe Hagi Academy, while players over 13 are part of Farul Constanța Academy. Viitorul's academy was well known for developing young players in Romania and having some of the best facilities in the country.

Grounds

The club used to play its home matches on Stadionul Farul in Constanța. Originally known as Stadionul 1 Mai, the stadium was opened in 1955 and had the shape of the letter "U", but subsequently it was expanded with another stand, finally reaching the capacity of 15,520 seats. After the bankruptcy of the club in 2016, the new entity has encountered administrative problems that have prevented the team from playing on the stadium for more than a year and a half. SSC Farul played from 2016 until 14 April 2018 on Stadionul Sparta, from Techirghiol, with a capacity of 1,000 people. Stadionul Farul reached an advanced condition of degradation due to lack of activity, and had to be cleaned and restored as functional by Farul supporters through several volunteer campaigns.

In 1970, Stadionul Farul became the first stadium in Romania to have floodlights installed.

On 21 June 2021, as the merge between Farul and Viitorul was announced, it was also mentioned that Farul will play its home matches on Viitorul Stadium, due to Farul Stadium's advanced state of degradation.

Support
Farul has many supporters in the Dobruja region, and especially in Constanța. Farul supporters are organized in the Farul Supporters Association, and this organization brought the club back to life in 2016 after the bankruptcy of the old entity. The first ultras group, entitled "Ultras Farul '92", appeared in 1992. They were followed in 1996 by "Legiunea Marină", and over time by several other groups, such as: "Aria Ultra'", "Baricada", "Fervent" or "Alcoholics".

Rivalries
The traditional rivals of "the Sailors" are Rapid București and Dinamo București. Farul also has some local rivalries against teams from nearby cities, such as CS Năvodari, Săgeata Năvodari or Delta Tulcea. However, these are of low intensity.

Milestones
 1949: Year of establishment after the merger of Dezrobirea and PCA (Porturi Comunicații Ape).
 1955: First match in Divizia A: Dinamo București 4–1 Farul Constanța
 1955: Opening of Farul Stadium.
 1966: Balkans Cup Final: Rapid București – Farul Constanța 3–3, 2–0
 1995: First participation in the UEFA Intertoto Cup
 1999: 1000th match in the Divizia A: Foresta Fălticeni 2–0 Farul Constanța
 2005: 2005 Cupa României Final: Dinamo București 1–0 Farul Constanța
 2006: UEFA Intertoto Cup Third round: Auxerre – Farul Constanța 4–1, 0–1
 2021: Fusion with FC Viitorul Constanța

Honours

Domestic

Leagues 

 Liga I
 Winners (1): 2016–17 (as Viitorul Constanța)
 Liga II
 Winners (5): 1954, 1957–58, 1961–62, 1980–81, 1987–88
 Runners-up (2): 1979–80, 2000–01
 Liga III
 Winners (1): 2017–18
 Liga IV – Constanța County
 Winners (1): 2016–17

Cups 

 Cupa României
 Winners (1): 2018–19 (as Viitorul Constanța)
 Runners-up (1): 2004–05
 Supercupa României
 Winners (1): 2019 (as Viitorul Constanța)
 Runners-up (1): 2017 (as Viitorul Constanța)

European 

 UEFA Intertoto Cup
 Runners-up (1): 2006

 Balkans Cup
 Runners-up (1): 1964–66

Players

First-team squad

Farul II and Youth Academy

Out on loan

Club officials

Board of directors

 Last updated: 8 September 2022
 Source: Board of Directors

Current technical staff

 Last updated: 8 September 2022
 Source: Technical staff
 Source: Medical staff

European record

UEFA Intertoto Cup 

 1R: First round
 2R: Second round
 3R: Third round
 R16: Round of 16

League history

Notable players
The footballers enlisted below have had international cap(s) for their respective countries at junior and/or senior level and/or more than 100 caps for FCV Farul Constanța.

Romania
  Marcel Abăluță
  Marian Aliuță
  Dumitru Antonescu
  Iulian Apostol
  Sorin Avram
  Cosmin Băcilă
  Ionuț Bădescu
  Robert Băjan
  Alexandru Bălțoi
  Gheorghe Barbu
  Ion Barbu
  Octavian Brânzei
  Vasile Brătianu
  Iosif Bükössy
  Gheorghe Butoiu
  Petre Cădariu
  Stelian Carabaș
  Dumitru Caraman
  Daniel Ciucă
  Mugurel Cornățeanu
  Vasilică Cristocea
  George Curcă
  Gheorghe Ciurea
  Tiberiu Curt
  Marian Dinu

Romania
  Marin Dragnea
  Răzvan Farmache
  Laurențiu Florea
  Mircea Georgescu
  Petre Grigoraș
  Mihai Guriță
  Gheorghe Hagi
  Sevastian Iovănescu
  Tiberiu Kallo
  Constantin Koszka
  Florin Lungu
  Vasile Mănăilă
  Cosmin Matei
  Alexandru Mățel
  Ion Mateescu
  Liviu Mihai
  Dănuț Moisescu
  Cristian Munteanu
  Ștefan Nanu
  Gheorghe Nițu
  Bănică Oprea
  Paul Papp
  Cosmin Pașcovici
  Florin Pătrașcu

Romania
  Ștefan Petcu
  Pavel Peniu
  Marian Popa
  Dumitru Popescu
  Alexi Pitu
  Aurel Rădulescu
  Viorel Sălceanu
  Ștefan Sameș
  Mircea Sasu
  Cristian Șchiopu
  Adrian Senin
  Dennis Șerban
  Marius Soare
  Mircea Stan
  Mihai Stere
  Ioan Tătăran
  Dinu Todoran
  Gabriel Torje
  Sorin Trofin
  Marin Tufan
  Ion Zare
  Ianis Zicu
  Iosif Vigu
  Ion Voicu

Congo
  Armel Disney

Liberia
  Ben Teekloh

Nigeria
  Kehinde Fatai

Notable coaches

  Ioan Andone
  Ion Barbu
  Augustin Botescu
  Gheorghe Constantin
  Wolfgang Frank
  Petre Grigoraș
  Emanoil Hașoti
  Marin Ion
  Virgil Mărdărescu
  Bazil Marian
  Florin Marin
  Eugen Mladin
  Ioan Sdrobiș
  Vasile Simionaș
  Mihai Stoichiță
  Marius Șumudică
  Momčilo Vukotić

References

External links

 Official Website
 
 Club profile on UEFA's official website

Football clubs in Constanța County
Sport in Constanța
Association football clubs established in 1920
Fan-owned football clubs
Liga I clubs
Liga II clubs
Liga III clubs
Liga IV clubs
1920 establishments in Romania